The Revista Complutense de Historia de América is a peer-reviewed academic journal covering the history of the Americas. It is published annually by the Complutense University of Madrid and is abstracted and indexed in Scopus. The editor-in-chief is Pilar Ponce Leiva (Universidad Complutense de Madrid).

External links 
 

History of the Americas journals
Annual journals
Complutense University of Madrid
Spanish-language journals
Publications established in 1975